Mangelia boschi is an extinct species of sea snail, a marine gastropod mollusk in the family Mangeliidae.

Description

Distribution
This extinct marine species was found in Pliocene strata in Java, Indonesia

References

External links

boschi
Gastropods described in 1935